Syed Akber Ali Wahidi (7 August 1957  25 April 2011) was a Pakistani sports statistician, writer, journalist, historian and media manager of the Pakistan Football Federation. Often referred to in Pakistan as "Walking Encyclopedia of Football", his work such as history, statistics and records was primarily focused on football and field hockey. He is also known for his statistical analysis which replaced the FIFA's record books entry for the second fastest goalscorer after then second-placed record holder Bryan Robson was replaced by Václav Mašek while Robson's second fastest goalscorer entry was corrected to the first division. In 2010, FIFA offered him a visit for match coverage in the 2010 FIFA World Cup.

He was born in Karachi, Pakistan. He did his BA degree in civil engineering from the NED University of Engineering & Technology. After completing his education, he left civil engineering and started working as a sports writer for football in particular.

Career 
He started his career in 1974 as a sports journalist and wrote in  both Urdu and English language. He initially earned his recognition after he started writing for an Urdu magazine Khel ki Dunya. As an executive editor, he also worked for the now defunct sports Urdu language football gazette Monthly Football Magazine.

In 1992, he made his association with the National Football Championship as a tournament media in-charge which was for the for time sponsored by Lifebuoy soap in Pakistan. He was also offered media manager post by Pakistan Hockey Federation and Pakistan Cricket Board but he refused to accept the proposal and worked for football until he died in 2011 of cardiac arrest when he was covering the 21st PFF National Challenge Cup in Faisalabad.

References 

1957 births
2011 deaths
Pakistani male journalists
Journalists from Karachi